Paula J. Giddings (born 1947 in Yonkers, New York) is an American writer, historian, and civil rights activist. She is the author of When and Where I Enter: The Impact of Black Women on Race and Sex in America, In Search of Sisterhood: Delta Sigma Theta and the Challenge of the Black Sorority Movement and Ida, A Sword Among Lions: Ida B. Wells and the Campaign Against Lynching.

Early life
Paula J. Giddings was born on November 16, 1947 in Yonkers, New York to Virginia Iola Stokes and Curtis Gulliver Giddings. She grew up in a predominantly white neighborhood in Yonkers, New York, where she regularly and systematically experienced isolation and racism from her white neighbors. As a teen in Yonkers, Giddings personally experienced and witnessed the racism and violence against African Americans that led to and occurred in reaction to the Civil Rights Movement. This led her to participate in the movement as a Freedom Rider. According to Giddings, this set the stage for her desire to understand both oppression and resistance to it, a theme that would recur through her own activism and writing.

Education 
Giddings enrolled in the historically Black college Howard University in 1965, where she worked on the university's newspaper beginning in her first year. In 1967, she became editor of the university's literary magazine,The Promethean, and graduated with a Bachelor of Arts in English in 1969. As a student at Howard, Giddings was part of a group of students who worked against sexism, colorism, and classism that they saw as rampant on their campus.

Career 
From 1969 to 1972, Giddings worked for Random House, first as an editorial assistant and later as a copy editor. She then became an associate book editor for the Howard University Press. In 1975, she moved to Paris, France to serve as the Paris bureau chief for Encore America/Worldwide News. Two years later, she transferred to the New York office, where she served as an associate editor until 1979. In 1975, she traveled to South Africa where she had the opportunity to meet leaders of the Anti-Apartheid Movement.  

In 1984, Giddings published her first book, When and Where I Enter: The Impact of Black Women on Race and Sex in America. The book tracks the history of Black women in the United States through the 1970s and the confluence of the Civil Rights and Women's Rights movements. Kirkus Reviews described the book as "the first historical study of the relationship, in America, between racism and sexism--broad-ranging, occasionally plodding, generally sound and insightful." The following year, Giddings served as contributing editor and book review editor for Essence magazine and became a distinguished scholar for the United Negro College Fund (UNCF). 

In 1988, Giddings joined the faculty of Douglass College at Rutgers University. That same year, she published In Search of Sisterhood: Delta Sigma Theta and the Challenge of the Black Sorority Movement, a history of Delta Sigma Theta, the African-American sorority of which she is a member. The book was recognized for its depth and its focus on the influence of Delta Sigma Theta and its members. 

In 2001, Giddings joined Smith College as the Elizabeth A. Woodson 1922 Professor of Africana Studies. She also served as the editor of feminist journal Meridians, feminism, race, transnationalism. She then became Smith College department chair and honors thesis advisor for the department of Africana studies, where she remained until her retirement in 2017.

Giddings received many accolades upon the 2008 publication of her biography of civil rights activist Ida B. Wells. Ida, A Sword Among Lions: Ida B. Wells and the Campaign Against Lynching received the 2008 Letitia Woods Brown Book Prize from the Association of Black Women Historians, the Gustavus Myers Center for the Study of Bigotry and Human Rights Outstanding Book Award, and was the 2009 Nonfiction winner of the Black Caucus of the American Library Association Literary Award. In addition, it was a finalist for the National Book Critics Circle Award for 2008 and was named a Best Book of 2008 by both the Washington Post and the Chicago Tribune. Additionally, the book was recognized as the inaugural Duke University John Hope Franklin Research Center Book Award winner in 2011.

In 2017, Giddings was a National Book Award Judge for nonfiction works. That same year, she was inducted into the American Academy of Arts and Sciences.

Selected publications 

Ida, A Sword Among Lions: Ida B. Wells and the Campaign Against Lynching (Amistad/HarperCollins, 2008)
Burning All Illusions: Writings from The Nation on Race 1866-2002 (Editor) (Thunder's Mouth Press, 2002)
In Search of Sisterhood: Delta Sigma Theta and the Challenge of the Black Sorority Movement (William Morrow & Co, 1988; Quill Publishers, 1995)
When and Where I Enter: The Impact of Black Women on Race and Sex in America (William Morrow  & Co, 1984; Bantam Press, 1985; 2nd: William Morrow Paperbacks, 1996)

Selected honors and awards

The following is a brief listing of some of the recognition Paula Giddings has received for her work and its impact.
Candace Award for History, National Coalition of 100 Black Women, 1984
John Simon Guggenheim Memorial Foundation Fellow, 1993
Letitia Woods Brown Book Prize from the Association of Black Women Historians for Ida, 2008
Gustavus Myers Center for the Study of Bigotry and Human Rights Outstanding Book Award for Ida, 2008
Los Angeles Times Book Award for Biography for Ida, 2008
National Book Critics Circle Award finalist for Ida, 2008
Ida named a Best Book of 2008, The Washington Post
Ida named a Best Book of 2008, The Chicago Tribune.
 Nonfiction winner of the Black Caucus of the American Library Association Literary Award, 2009
Inaugural John Hope Franklin Research Center Book Award, 2011
American Academy of Arts and Sciences, 2017
 Howard University Distinguished Alumni Achievement Award In The Field of Journalism, 2018
 Phi Beta Kappa Visiting Scholar
 Guggenheim Foundation Fellowship
 fellowship by the National Humanities Center
 fellowship by the Center for Advanced Study in the Behavioral Sciences at Stanford University
 Honorary Doctorates from Bennett College and Wesleyan University

External links

PEN America Center

References 

1947 births
Living people
Rutgers University faculty
Smith College faculty
Spelman College faculty
Princeton University faculty
North Carolina Central University faculty
Duke University faculty
Delta Sigma Theta members